Sporting Clube de Portugal history and statistics in the UEFA competitions.

1963–64 UEFA Cup Winners' Cup
The 1963–64 European Cup Winners' Cup was won by Sporting Clube de Portugal of Portugal, who defeated MTK Budapest of Hungary in the final. It was the first and only time a Portuguese team side has won a UEFA Cup Winners' Cup trophy.

Sporting CP entered the competition to defeat Atalanta in the qualifying round, past APOEL was to the history of biggest win in UEFA competitions 16–1, Manchester United, Olympique Lyonnais and in the end defeated MTK Budapest, the same final that was played over two legs on neutral ground. Sporting Clube de Portugal win their first European title.

Honours
 European Cup Winners' Cup
 Winners (1): 1963−64
 UEFA Cup
 Runners-up (1): 2004–05

Matches

From 1955–56 to 1979–80

Note: Sporting CP score always listed first.

From 1980–81 to 1999–2000

Note: Sporting CP score always listed first.

From 2000–01 to present

Last updated: 16 March 2023Note: Sporting CP score always listed first.

Overall record

By competition

Finals

Notes

References

Sporting CP
Portuguese football clubs in international competitions